The Yankee Way is a 1917 American silent comedy-drama film directed by Richard Stanton and starring George Walsh, Enid Markey and Joseph J. Dowling.

Cast
 George Walsh as Dick Mason 
 Enid Markey as Princess Alexia 
 Joseph J. Dowling as Colonel Mason 
 Charles Edler as 'Coyote' Jones 
 James O'Shea as James O'Malley 
 Edward Sedgwick as Robert Gillette 
 Fritz von Hardenberg as Baron Maravitch
 Edward Cecil as Count Vortsky 
 Tom Wilson as George Washington Brown

References

Bibliography
 Solomon, Aubrey. The Fox Film Corporation, 1915-1935: A History and Filmography. McFarland, 2011.

External links
 

1917 films
1917 comedy-drama films
American silent feature films
American black-and-white films
Films directed by Richard Stanton
Fox Film films
1910s English-language films
1910s American films
Silent American comedy-drama films